Sven Johansson (born 1 January 1945) is a retired Swedish rifle shooter. He competed in two-three individual events at the 1968, 1972, 1976 and 1980 Olympics and won a bronze medal in 50 metre rifle three positions in 1980. Johansson also won one bronze medal at the world (1970) and two at European championships (1969 and 1977).

References

1945 births
Living people
People from Värnamo Municipality
Swedish male sport shooters
Olympic shooters of Sweden
Olympic bronze medalists for Sweden
Shooters at the 1968 Summer Olympics
Shooters at the 1972 Summer Olympics
Shooters at the 1976 Summer Olympics
Shooters at the 1980 Summer Olympics
Medalists at the 1980 Summer Olympics
Olympic medalists in shooting
Sportspeople from Jönköping County
20th-century Swedish people
21st-century Swedish people